Salman Shahr District is a district (bakhsh) in Abbasabad County, Mazandaran Province, Iran. At the 2006 census, its population was 20,431, in 5,590 families.  The District has one city: Salman Shahr. The District has one rural district (dehestan): Langarud Rural District.

References 

Abbasabad County
Districts of Mazandaran Province